Alberny Vargas (born 5 June 1969) is a Colombian former cyclist. He competed in two events at the 1992 Summer Olympics.

References

External links
 

1969 births
Living people
Colombian male cyclists
Olympic cyclists of Colombia
Cyclists at the 1992 Summer Olympics
Place of birth missing (living people)
20th-century Colombian people